The Bureau of Energy Resources (ENR) is a bureau in the United States Department of State that coordinates the department's efforts in promoting international energy security. Under the purview of the Under Secretary of State for Economic Growth, Energy, and the Environment. the Bureau of Energy Resources' current head is Assistant Secretary Geoffrey R. Pyatt.

History
The Bureau of Energy Resources was established in October 2011, following a recommendation in the 2010 Quadrennial Diplomacy and Development Review calling on the department to create a bureau uniting diplomatic and programmatic efforts in the global production and use of energy. The new bureau combined personnel and assets previously assigned to existing energy-related offices in the department, primarily from what is now the Bureau of Economic and Business Affairs.

Organization

The bureau is headed by the Special Envoy and Coordinator for International Energy Affairs, who is appointed by the United States Secretary of State. Four Deputy Assistant Secretaries also oversee different divisions of the bureau, namely Energy Diplomacy, Energy Transformation, Energy Governance and Access, and Bureau Implementation and Coordination. Six unique offices exist within the bureau:
Office of Europe, the Western Hemisphere, and Africa
Office of the Middle East and Asia
Office of Alternative and Renewable Energy
Office of Electricity and Energy Efficiency
Office of Policy Analysis and Public Diplomacy
Office of Energy Programs

The bureau manages three foreign assistance programs with a total FY 2014 budget of $11.8 million in economic support funds. ENR relies heavily on interagency agreements with the Departments of Interior, Commerce, and Treasury, as well as on contracted private-sector firms, to implement technical assistance.

See also
Energy diplomacy
United States Special Envoy for Eurasian Energy
United States Department of Energy

References

External links
 

ENR
Energy policy of the United States
Government agencies established in 2011
Petroleum politics